Aeolus Valley is a village in the Yallahs district of the Jamaican parish of Saint Thomas. Although there has been a recent wave of violence and murders, residents still say that the community is a wonderful place.

Prominent people from Aeolus Valley
Dorothy Lightbourne, Attorney General of Jamaica

Christobal "Kriz Kapital" Laurence, 
Reggae/Dancehall Artist

Populated places in Saint Thomas Parish, Jamaica